Qwirkle is a tile-based game for two to four players, designed by Susan McKinley Ross and published by MindWare. Qwirkle shares some characteristics with the games Rummikub and Scrabble. It is distributed in Canada by game and puzzle company Outset Media. Qwirkle is considered by MindWare to be its most awarded game of all time. In 2011, Qwirkle won the Spiel des Jahres, widely considered the most prestigious award in the board and card game industry. A sequel, Qwirkle Cubes, was released by Mindware in 2009.

Equipment

Qwirkle comes with 108 wooden tiles. Each tile is painted with one of six shapes (clover, four-point star, eight-point star, square, circle and diamond) in one of six colors (red, orange, yellow, green, blue and purple); there are three examples of each of the 36 tile color and shape combinations. The box also contains a bag to store the tiles and a rule book.

Play

The game begins with all the tiles being placed in the bag and mixed thoroughly. Each player then draws six random tiles; each player's tiles are not displayed to the other players. All players declare the largest number of tiles of their initial set in one shape or one color, not including duplicates. Play starts with the player who can place the most tiles with their initial draw. After the first player's turn, play proceeds clockwise.

During their turn, a player may either:

 place one or several tiles on the table; or
 instead of playing tiles, or if none of the tiles held can be played, exchange one or more tiles in their hand for random tiles in the draw bag.

At least one of the tiles being placed must continue either the shape or color from at least one tile already laid down. For example: if there are three stars placed down on the grid (one green, one blue, and one purple), then the player can put down another star that is red, orange or yellow next to one of the tiles already laid down. In addition, all of the tiles laid down in a turn must be played in one line, although they do not need to touch other tiles being placed in that turn. Refer to the illustrated example for legal moves.

Players are responsible for tallying and tracking their score at the end of their turn. A player must always end a turn with six tiles, so, if they place tiles during a turn, they draw random tiles to build their hand back up to six.

If the player chooses to exchange tiles instead of placing, replacement tiles are drawn from the bag and the discarded tiles are mixed back into the bag afterward. The player scores no points following an exchanged-tiles turn.

Play continues until one person uses all of their available tiles and there are no more tiles to be drawn.

Scoring
Players score one point for each tile placed within a line, including existing tiles within the line.

Six bonus points are scored for completing a Qwirkle, which is a continuous line that has all six colors of one shape, or all six shapes of one color. For example: red, orange, yellow, green, blue, and purple circle tiles placed in a single line.

At the end of the game, once there are no more tiles to be drawn to replenish one's hand, the first person to play all of their tiles gains an extra six point bonus, at which point the game ends, and the player who has the highest score wins.

History
According to Ross, she conceived Qwirkle while watching two friends playing Scrabble and realizing how her favorite part of that game is when words are spelled in two different directions. After a few days, she had simplified her idea to use abstract shapes and colors and added the six-component bonus, calling the concept Abstrackle when she pitched it to MindWare, who gave it the final name.

Qwirkle gained internet fame after review copies were sent to industry websites, including to Scott Alden, who operated BoardGameGeek and W. Eric Martin, who ran Boardgame News. Martin brought the game with him on a trip to Berlin and played it with game designers there, including Thorsten Gimmler, a product manager at Schmidt Spiele, who went on to contact MindWare directly, asking for the rights for a German release. With its release there in 2010, it became eligible for the Spiel des Jahres.

Awards
2011 Spiel des Jahres
Parent's Choice Gold Award
Mensa Select Award
Major Fun Award

Variants and expansions
Rather than wooden tiles, the game can be played with six-sided dice (Qwirkle Cubes) or cards (Qwirkle Cards). In addition, the original game has two expansions: Qwirkle Select and Qwirkle Connect; these are sold bundled with the original game as Qwirkle Big Box or Qwirkle Trio.

Qwirkle Cubes
Qwirkle Cubes has the same goals and gameplay mechanics as Qwirkle, but instead of tiles, the playing pieces are 90 six-sided dice; there are 15 dice in each of the six colors. All six shapes of a given color are printed on the six faces of a single die.

After the initial draw, each player rolls the six dice they had selected to form their hand, which is kept visible to the other players. As in Qwirkle, players may place one or more dice into the playing field during their turn; if they do not have a piece that can be played, they must re-roll all of their dice until they can place at least one die. At the end of their turn, the player draws replacement dice and rolls the replacement dice (not the leftover dice already in the player's hand) before absorbing the replacement dice into their six-dice hand.

Qwirkle Cards
Qwirkle Cards, also known as Qwirkle Rummy, follows the same pattern/shape matching mechanic of Qwirkle, but uses 108 playing cards instead of the wooden tiles. Each player receives nine cards to start. Rather than placing tiles face-up in a tableau with matching edges, cards are played into stacks of matched colors or shapes. Each player may play multiple cards into more than one stack during their turn; a new stack can be formed by the player, provided that stack has at least three cards in it and none of the cards are duplicates. When a Qwirkle stack is formed, the player removes the completed stack and keeps it for scoring at the end. In addition, after placing cards in play, the player may switch any cards previously played by moving one or more cards into a different stack, with the caveat that after the switching is completed, all stacks are a three-card minimum size with no duplicates.

References

External links
 
 
 
 Expansions
 , includes original game, Select, and Connect
 , includes Select and Connect
 

Tile-laying board games
Mensa Select winners
Board games introduced in 2007
Spiel des Jahres winners